Erik Georg Ragnar Kruskopf (born 29 August 1930 in Helsinki) is a Finland-Swedish art critic, art historian and writer. He has also worked as among assistant director at the Finnish National Opera, editor at the Finnish newspaper Hufvudstadsbladet and art history professor at the University of Tromsø.

He has written several books, among them Människan och målaren ("The Human and The Painter") (together with Ulla-Lena Lundberg), a biography of the painter Åke Hellman published until Hellman's 90th birthday in 2005, and several books about the artist and author Tove Jansson.

External links
Erik Kruskopf on Uppslagsverket Finland

Finnish writers in Swedish
Finnish editors
1930 births
Living people
People from Helsinki
Finnish art historians
Finnish art critics